Donald James Ross, or Don Ross, (born November 19, 1960) is a Canadian fingerstyle guitarist. He is the only person to win the National Fingerstyle Guitar Championship twice (1988 and 1996). His album Huron Street reached the top ten on the Billboard New-age chart.

Biography
Ross was born in Montreal, Quebec to Scottish and Mi'kmaq parents. He studied composition at the music department of York University in Toronto with David Mott, James Tenney and Phil Werren. After receiving his Bachelor of Fine Arts in Music in 1983, he studied philosophy at St. Hyacinth College and Seminary in Granby, Massachusetts while living at San Damiano Friary in Holyoke, Massachusetts and then started his novitiate for the Canadian custody of the Conventual Franciscans of Immaculate Conception Province at St. Francis Friary in Staten Island, NY. He decided to leave that pursuit and become a musician.

In 1986 Ross produced and published his first album, Kehewin, on cassette, and became a full-time musician. He performed as a duo with his wife, singer Kelly McGowan, in 1986 and 1987, and then in a trio called Harbord Trio with her and violinist Oliver Schroer. At the same time he was member of a New Age jazz quartet called Eye Music. He composed music for several theatre productions in Toronto dealing with First Nations life in Canada, such as The Ecstasy of Rita Joe (York University, 1989), Dreaming Beauty (Inner Stage Theatre, 1990) and Big Buck City (Cahoots Theatre, 1991). He has also composed music for the CBC radio serial Dead Dog Café. In 1987 some of his compositions were played by the Toronto Symphony Orchestra.

His first place win, after two previous attempts, in the 1988 American Walnut Valley Festival earned him a contract with Duke Street Records, Toronto, where he published his next two albums, 1989's Bearing Straight and 1990's Don Ross. Since then he has released several mostly instrumental CDs, though some of them feature him as a singer. He published three instructional videos, several single transcriptions and a book with nine of his pieces, and worked with the magazine Canadian Musician. At the Ontario Council of Folk Festivals he won a prize with his wife Kelly, and in 1996 he won his second first prize at the Walnut Valley Festival. Since 1997 he guides the Don Ross Cannington Guitar Weekend, a guitar workshop.

In 2001 his first wife Kelly McGowan died, and Ross was left with his kids. In 2005 he married Brooke Miller, a singer-songwriter from Prince Edward Island.

Don Ross was the first artist to sign with indie record label Candyrat Records, in 2005. The label's roster includes Andy McKee, Nicholas Barron, Antoine Dufour, The Reign of Kindo, and his own wife Brooke Miller.

Ross has done three tours with the Men of Steel guitar group, the last of which was mounted in 2006. The band is a mix of international members including bluegrass maestro Dan Crary, acoustic guitarist Beppe Gambetta, and Celtic folk guitarist Tony McManus. 

Ross performs most of his concerts solo, but has also regularly performed with Andy McKee, Brooke Miller, and bassist Jordan O'Connor.

In 2010–2011 Ross was a Dalhousie University professor teaching history of guitar and techniques, while still travelling extensively for music. He did not renew his contract for the following year due to high demand for concert appearances around the world.

In 2012, Ross moved back to his hometown of Montreal, Quebec. Ross is currently residing near Charlottetown, Prince Edward Island.

Style and technique 
Ross's music borrows from blues, jazz, folk and classical music creating a style that he describes as "heavy wood". 
Ross names Bruce Cockburn, John Renbourn, Pierre Bensusan, Keith Jarrett, Egberto Gismonti and Pat Metheny as his main sources of inspiration.<ref name="sony">[https://web.archive.org/web/20001027073919/http://www.sonymusic.com/artists/DonRoss/dr/technique_1.html  In Tune.  Guitar with Don Ross]. Accessed on November 10, 2007.</ref> One of his songs, "Michael, Michael, Michael", is dedicated to Michael Hedges, and Ross has performed straight covers of his compositions. One obvious but unattributed influence is the psychedelic 1967 track 'Embryonic Journey' by Jefferson Airplane. Ross's advanced technique and his sure feeling for rhythm combine with uncommon ideas to make his style instantly recognizable. He often uses percussive techniques and plays intricate down and upstroke patterns with his thumb. These techniques have found their way into the toolboxes of many competitive fingerstyle guitarists. His use of acrylic nails allows him to get a consistent, clean tone without the hassle of broken fingernails.

Don Ross played a Lowden S-10 in the beginning of his career, but since 1997 has played a Lowden O-10. Today he plays custom-made guitars by Marc Beneteau, a Canadian luthier from St. Thomas, Ontario. The Beneteaus are equipped with a combination of microphone and K&K pickups. Occasionally he plays a baritone guitar and a harp guitar by Marc Beneteau, or uses a custom 7-string by Oskar Graf, a luthier from Clarendon, Ontario.

In the liner notes to Ross' 2003 album Robot Monster, Bruce Cockburn writes, "Nobody does what Don Ross does with an acoustic guitar. He takes the corners so fast you think he's going to roll, but he never loses control."

Discography
Solo or duo
 1989: Bearing Straight, (Duke Street)
 1990: Don Ross, (Duke Street)
 1992: Three Hands, (Duke Street)
 1995: This Dragon Won't Sleep, (Sony Canada)
 1996: Wintertide, (Sony Canada)
 1997: Loaded, Leather, Moonroof, (Sony Canada)
 1999: Passion Session, (Narada)
 2001: Huron Street, (Narada)
 2003: Robot Monster, (Narada)
 2005: Music for Vacuuming, (CandyRat)
 2006: Men of Steel - Four Way Mirror, (Goby Fish)
 2006: Live in Your Head, (Goby Fish)
 2007: Wave From Your Window, (Goby Fish)
 2008: The Thing That Came from Somewhere, with Andy McKee (CandyRat)
 2009: Any Colour, (Goby Fish)
 2010: Breakfast for Dogs, (CandyRat)
 2012: Upright and Locked Position, (CandyRat)
 2013: 12:34, with Calum Graham (CandyRat)
 2014: PS15, (CandyRat)
 2014: Flake, (CandyRat)
 2017: A Million Brazilian Civilians, (CandyRat)

Groups
 1990: Circle of Stone, by Harbord Trio (Don Ross/Kelly McGowan/Oliver Schroer) (Familiar Music)
 2003: Live: The Art of the Steel-String Guitar, by Men of Steel (Don Ross/Beppe Gambetta/Dan Crary/Tony McManus), (Thunderation)
 2006: Four Way Mirror, by Men of Steel (Don Ross/Beppe Gambetta/Dan Crary/Tony McManus), (Goby Fish)
 2019: Don Ross Louder Than Usual, with Andrew Craig on keyboards, Jordan O’Connor on bass, Marito Marques on drums, and Don Ross on guitar and vocals (G.F.M)

DVDs
 2004: Don Ross: Live, (CandyRat)
 2006: Don Ross/Andy McKee/Michael Manring: Live in Toronto'', (CandyRat)

See also 
Jon Gomm
Erik Mongrain
Andy Mckee
First Nations music
Music of Canada

References 
Citations

Further reading
Don Ross Biography by Betty Nygaard King. Accessed on November 10, 2007.

External links
Don Ross official website
Candyrat Records label website
FingerstyleGuitarists.com Don Ross Interview
highSCORE Special Week 2012 An exclusive one-week workshop with Don Ross

1960 births
Living people
20th-century First Nations people
21st-century First Nations people
Anglophone Quebec people
Canadian guitarists
Canadian people of Scottish descent
Fingerstyle guitarists
First Nations musicians
Mi'kmaq people
Narada Productions artists
Seven-string guitarists
York University alumni